Martin Damm and Cyril Suk were the defending champions but did not compete that year.

Leander Paes and Nenad Zimonjić won in the final 7–5, 3–6, 7–5 against Raemon Sluiter and Martin Verkerk.

Seeds

  Mahesh Bhupathi /  Joshua Eagle (first round)
  David Adams /  Robbie Koenig (first round)
  Jan-Michael Gambill /  Graydon Oliver (semifinals)
  František Čermák /  Leoš Friedl (first round)

Draw

External links
 2003 Delray Beach International Tennis Championships Doubles draw

2003
2003 ATP Tour
2003 Delray Beach International Tennis Championships